The Big Give is a non-profit, charitable website that enables donors to find and support charity projects in their field of interest. It was founded in October 2007 by Sir Alec Reed CBE. His son James Reed  became Chair of Trustees in 2019.

Its main activity is online match funding campaigns, where public donations are matched by donations from notable philanthropists; these donors are referred to as "Champions" and include The Reed Foundation, The Julia and Hans Rausing Trust and The Waterloo Foundation. The Big Give's campaigns have been promoted by celebrities including Leonardo DiCaprio, Stephen Fry, Dame Judi Dench, Emilia Fox and David Walliams among others.

Since fundraising began in 2008, The Big Give has raised over £233m for thousands of charity projects, including over £3.67m for the Disasters Emergency Committee's Ukraine Humanitarian Appeal, £5.5 million for COVID-19 relief efforts and over £2 million for those affected by the Grenfell Tower fire. Its 2022 Christmas Challenge raised £28.6 million, the highest amount to date and a £4m increase over the previous year's total.

The organisation is one of the UK's largest philanthropic endeavours. It has set a target of raising £1bn by 2030. Sponsorship and managerial support is provided by the Reed family's Reed Foundation, which is funded by an 18% stake in Reed Group, prompting The Guardian newspaper to write in 2021 that Reed Group employees "...effectively work one day a week to fund good causes". James Reed was appointed Commander of the Order of the British Empire (CBE) in the 2023 New Year Honours for services to business and charity.

History
In 1985 Alec Reed established the Reed Foundation to serve as the Reed family's philanthropic arm. The Foundation was endowed with £5m from the Reed Group's £20m sale of its Medicare division, with Alec Reed using his windfall from the sale to give the Foundation an 18% stake in Reed Group.

Reed established The Big Give after growing frustrated at the process of finding and assessing charities of interest to him. He used his experience of compiling searchable websites to create an online database of charities, browsable by sector and including detailed information about their structure and accounts.

The Big Give's initial aim was to connect charities with wealthy individuals seeking to donate £100,000 or more, but charities found that donors were deterred by the high minimum donation, so Reed experimented with time-limited match funding, reasoning that "...there is nothing like a deadline to bring out [donors'] competitive nature."

In 2008, The Big Give launched its flagship online match funding campaign, The Christmas Challenge. Reed put up £1 million of his own money in match funding. It was matched by other donors within 45 minutes. Since then the format has been refined, with an increase in the number of philanthropist 'Champions' and the amount of match funds available. The Challenge is now the UK's largest online match funding campaign.

Fundraising activities

The Big Give Christmas Challenge 
The Big Give Christmas Challenge runs annually for seven days from #GivingTuesday, during which time donations to participating charities are doubled. The match funding used to double donations comes from both philanthropic partners of The Big Give ('Champions') and a charity's own major supporters ('Pledgers'). Champions include The Reed Foundation, The Childhood Trust, Candis, The Garfield Weston Foundation, The People's Postcode Lottery and The Waterloo Foundation.

Each charity has a ring-fenced matching pot used to double public donations until the pot is empty or until the Christmas Challenge ends, whichever is sooner.

The Christmas Challenge has run every year since 2008. It provides special awards for the best performing charities; in 2017 the overall winner was Aurora Orchestra.

As of 2023, the Christmas Challenge accounts for £173.8m (74%) of all monies raised by The Big Give.

Women & Girls Match Fund campaign 
In March 2022 The Big Give inaugurated its annual Women & Girls Match Fund campaign, on behalf of vulnerable, disadvantaged, or underrepresented women and girls in England and Scotland. The Big Give doubled public donations made to participating charities, drawing on funds provided by a grant from the Tampon Tax Fund. The campaign raised over £1.86m.

The Summer Give 
Since 2015, The Big Give has used its match funding model to run an annual Summer Give campaign in partnership with The Childhood Trust. The Summer Give offers match funding to charities alleviating child poverty in London, specifically aiming to keep children well-fed, safe and productively engaged during the summer holidays. It has helped over 87,658 children through partnerships with over 150 projects throughout London. In 2017, the Summer Give raised £778,680 for 36 participating charities.

The Green Match Fund 
To May 2022, The Big Give and partner organisation Environmental Funders Network has raised £2.7m for The Green Match Fund, to support charities working on environmental issues as part of their core mission.

Cut the Crap 
The Big Give has raised £88k for Surfers Against Sewage's Cut the Crap campaign, which lobbies against the pollution of Britain's waterways.

Emergency appeals 
The Big Give has adapted its match funding model to emergency appeals, which are launched quickly and in co-ordination with the Disasters Emergency Committee to raise money. Emergency Challenge Funds have been launched in response to the 2023 Turkey–Syria earthquake, typhoon Haiyan in the Philippines, earthquakes in Haiti and Nepal and other international emergencies. In October 2017 £232,446 was raised for Rohingya refugees escaping violence in Myanmar's Rakhine State. The funds were distributed to seven charities working directly with Rohingya refugees, including the British Red Cross and UNICEF UK.

Afghanistan Emergency Appeal 
In August 2021, The Big Give match-funded Afghanaid's Afghanistan Crisis Appeal, raising £78,257 to deliver emergency support to families uprooted by regional conflict and famine. Donations helped to provide domestic assistance kits for heating, food preparation and hygiene.

Covid-19 response 
The Big Give has raised over £5.5m through various COVID-19 relief campaigns, including £1.36m for the National Emergencies Trust COVID-19 Emergency Appeal, with donations from 1,900 individuals. The appeal funded food and sanitation supplies to support the elderly and vulnerable across the UK. Co-funders included the Julia and Hans Rausing Trust, the Reed family, Reed Foundation and Cazenove Capital (Schroders). In July 2020 The Big Give raised £3.2m for Champions for Children, a joint campaign with The Childhood Trust to match fund 94 charities in support of vulnerable children in London affected by the 2020 COVID-19 pandemic.

In April 2021 Management Today gave its Special Recognition Award to Reed for the firm's COVID-19 relief efforts.

DEC Ukraine Humanitarian Appeal 
Following the 2022 Russian invasion of Ukraine, The Big Give raised over £3.67m for the Disasters Emergency Committee Ukraine Humanitarian Appeal, helping DEC charities and their local partners provide food, water, health assistance, protection and trauma care within Ukraine and neighbouring countries.

Grenfell Tower fire 
The charity raised over £2.6m in an online match funding campaign for those affected by the Grenfell Tower fire. The appeal raised £1 million in the first 48 hours and £2m a week later. In total the appeal raised £2,612,646. The Charity reported funding from the Reed Foundation, The Cadogan Estate, Julia and Hans Rausing and The Bjorgolfsson Family among others.

Other activities

Philanthropy in Schools
The Big Give's 'Philanthropy in Schools' programme seeks to encourage the next generation of philanthropists by promoting research into charities and charitable donations. Participating schools partner with a sponsor who funds Big Give vouchers which students donate to their chosen charities. Students compete to make the best presentation on their preferred charities; the winning team receives an additional donation to its chosen charity.

The Big Give Trustee Finder
The Big Give Trustee Finder advertises vacancies for charitable trusts, organised by skill, interest and location. In 2013 the service was extended to feature vacancies on the Reed website for six weeks.

The Big Advice Column
In 2012 The Big Give introduced an online advice column, The Big Advice Column, where a team of experts answer questions posed by charities.

References

External links
 Official site for thebiggive.org.uk
 About The Big Give

British fundraising websites
Charities based in London
Charity events in the United Kingdom
Charity fundraisers
Foundations based in the United Kingdom
Organisations based in the London Borough of Camden